Stjepan Vrbančić (29 November 1900 – 12 December 1988) was a Croatian footballer. He played with Zagreb's top football clubs: with HAŠK from 1918 to 1926 and HŠK Concordia Zagreb from 1926 to 1935.

International career
Vrbančić made his debut for Yugoslavia in a June 1922 friendly match against Czechoslovakia and earned a total of 12 caps, scoring no goals. He played with the team at the 1924 Summer Olympics. His final international was an April 1927 friendly against Hungary.

References

External links
 
Profile at Serbian federation

1900 births
1988 deaths
Footballers from Zagreb
Association football defenders
Yugoslav footballers
Yugoslavia international footballers
Olympic footballers of Yugoslavia
Footballers at the 1924 Summer Olympics
HAŠK players
HŠK Concordia players